Events from the year 1882 in art.

Events
 April 9 – English poet and artist Dante Gabriel Rossetti dies aged 53 of Bright's disease at Birchington-on-Sea in the care of his brother, the critic William Michael Rossetti.
 March 1 – Seventh Impressionist exhibition in Paris opens at 251 rue Saint-Honoré. 
 August – Vincent van Gogh starts painting in oil on the sea coast at Scheveningen, sponsored by his brother Theo.
 Walter Langley moves to Newlyn on the coast of Cornwall, becoming the first resident artist of the Newlyn School.
 The gallery of botanical illustrations made and donated by Marianne North is opened at the Royal Botanic Gardens, Kew, the first permanent solo exhibition by a female artist in Britain.
 The Royal Manchester Institution transfers its galleries and collections to Manchester Corporation (England) as Manchester Art Gallery.

Works

 Marie Bashkirtseff – Head of a Woman
 Edward Burne-Jones – The Mill (1870–82; Victoria and Albert Museum, London)
 Edward Burne-Jones and William Morris – David's Charge to Solomon (stained-glass window, Trinity Church, Boston, Massachusetts)
 Gustave Caillebotte
 Fruits on a stand
 Yellow Roses in a Vase
 Paul Cézanne – Still Life With Compotier
 William Merritt Chase
 Azaleas
 In the Studio
 John Collier - Clytemnestra (Guildhall Art Gallery, City of London)
 Pierre Puvis de Chavannes – The Happy Land
 Henry Treffry Dunn – Rossetti and Watts-Dunton at 16 Cheyne Walk
 Frank Duveneck – Mary Cabot Wheelwright
 Nikolai Ge – Leo Tolstoy
 Aleksander Gierymski – In the Arbour
 Atkinson Grimshaw – Under the Moonbeams
 William Halsall – Mayflower in Plymouth Harbor
 William Henry Holmes – Panorama from Point Sublime, looking East; The Grand Cañon at the foot of the Toroweap and The Temples and Towers of the Virgen (illustrations to Clarence Dutton's Tertiary History of the Grand Cañon District published by the United States Geological Survey)
 Christian Krohg – Portrait of the Swedish Painter Karl Nordström
 P. S. Krøyer – Frederikke Tuxen
 Benjamin Williams Leader
 In the evening it shall be light
 Sunshine after Rain
 Wilhelm Leibl – Three Women in Church (Kunsthalle Hamburg)
 Konstantin Makovsky – Portrait of the Artist's Children
 Édouard Manet – A Bar at the Folies-Bergère
 Jan Matejko – Prussian Homage
 Albert Joseph Moore – Dreamers
 Frank O'Meara – Reverie
 Pierre Renoir – Blonde Bather (second version)
 Auguste Rodin – The Kiss (marble sculpture, original version, as Francesca da Rimini)
 John Singer Sargent
 Lady with the Rose (Charlotte Louise Burckhardt)
 Portraits d'enfants (The Daughters of Edward Darley Boit)
 Joseph-Noël Sylvestre – The Gaul Ducar decapitates the Roman general Flaminus at the Battle of Trasimene
 James Tissot – The Garden Bench
 Vincent van Gogh
 Adrianus Jacobus Zuyderland series of drawings
 Sien series of drawings, including Sorrow
 Lying Cow (two paintings – probable date)
 Viktor Vasnetsov – Sergius of Radonezh (icon for church at Abramtsevo Colony)
 William Frederick Yeames – Prince Arthur and Hubert de Burgh

Births
 January 15 – Daniel Vázquez Díaz, Spanish painter (died 1969)
 January 18 (January 6 OS) – Aleksandra Ekster, born Aleksandra Aleksandrovna Grigorovich, Russian-Ukrainian painter (Cubo-Futurist, Suprematist, Constructivist) and designer (died 1949)
 February 12 – Ljubomir Ivanović, Serbian painter (died 1945)
 April 2 – Estella Solomons, Irish painter (died 1968).
 April 16 – André Edouard Marty, French artist (died 1974)
 May 5 – Sylvia Pankhurst, English-born suffragette and artist (died 1960)
 May 13 – Georges Braque, French painter and sculptor (died 1963)
 June 1 – Signe Hammarsten-Jansson, Swedish graphic artist (died 1970)
 June 4 – John Bauer, Swedish illustrator (died 1918)
 June 11 – Alvin Langdon Coburn, American-born pictorialist photographer (died 1966)
 June 21 – Rockwell Kent, American painter, printmaker, illustrator and writer (died 1971)
 July 22 – Edward Hopper, American painter and printmaker (died 1967)
 August 14 – Gisela Richter, English archaeologist and art historian (died 1972)
 August – George Bellows, American painter (died 1925)
 October 3
 Auguste Chabaud, French painter (died 1955)
 A. Y. Jackson, Canadian painter (died 1974)
 October 10 – Lazar Drljača, Serbian painter (died 1970)
 October 19 – Umberto Boccioni, Italian Futurist painter and sculptor (died 1916)
 November 18 – Wyndham Lewis, Nova Scotia-born English Vorticist painter and writer (died 1957)
 December 28 – Lili Elbe, born Einar Magnus Andreas Wegener, Danish-born artist (died 1931)
 Undated – Todor Švrakić, Serbian painter (died 1931)

Deaths
 January 14 – Timothy H. O'Sullivan, American Civil War photographer (born 1840)
 January 20
 John Linnell, English landscape painter (born 1792)
 William Miller, Scottish Quaker engraver (born 1796)
 February 7 – Édouard De Bièfve, Belgian painter (born 1808)
 March 30 – Henri Lehmann, German-born French painter (born 1814)
 April 10 – Dante Gabriel Rossetti, English Pre-Raphaelite painter (born 1828)
 April 18 – Elizabeth Goodridge, American miniature painter (born 1798)
 May 20 - Pietro Boyesen, Danish-born photographer (born 1819)
 June 3 – Christian Wilberg, German painter (born 1839)
 June 20 – Auguste François Biard, French genre painter (born 1799)
 July 8 – Hablot Knight Browne ("Phiz"), English illustrator (born 1815)
 July 9 – Louis-Charles Verwee, Belgian painter (born 1832)
 August 14 – Niels Christian Kierkegaard, Danish draftsman and lithographer (born 1806)
 August 29 – Johann Halbig, German sculptor (born 1814)
 September 22 – Katarina Ivanović, Serbian painter (born 1811)
 September 23 – John Wharlton Bunney, English topographical painter (born 1828)
 October 25 – Emma Stebbins, American sculptor (born 1815)
 November 7 – Julius Hübner, German genre painter (born 1806)
 Unknown date
 James Eights, American scientist and watercolour painter (born 1798)
 George Hollingsworth, American painter (born 1813)

References

 
 
Years of the 19th century in art
1880s in art